Namyang Song clan was one of the Korean clans. Their Bon-gwan was in Suwon, Gyeonggi Province. According to the research in 2000, the number of Namyang Song clan was 10183. Their founder was  who was a Hanlin Academy in Tang dynasty. He was dispatched from Tang dynasty to Silla and served as Ministry of Personnel in Silla. He was settled in Namyang and began Namyang Song clan at a time when Silla was collapsed.

See also 
 Korean clan names of foreign origin

References

External links 
 

 
Korean clan names of Chinese origin